Christopher Ryan Walla (born November 2, 1975) is an American musician, record producer, and film music composer, best known for being a former guitarist and songwriter for the band Death Cab for Cutie.

Musical career

Early bands
While at Bothell High School in the early 1990s, Walla started a program called Open Microphone with creative writing teacher Laura Drumheller, as a noon-time forum for the arts, which allowed any student to take the stage and perform. Walla regularly performed at these shows, as well as serving as MC. One performance by Walla included a song by PJ Harvey. These early Open Microphone shows proved popular and continued for over twenty years, moving from Bothell High School to Inglemoor High School when teacher Drumheller transferred there. Walla was in a short-lived band called The Wallflowers (not to be confused with The Wallflowers of California). Later, in 2001, he was an early member of the Seattle band The Long Winters.

Death Cab for Cutie
Walla joined Death Cab for Cutie in 1997, while attending Western Washington University in Bellingham, Washington. Eventually releasing seven albums, four EPs and two live EPs with the band, he co-wrote many of their hit songs, including "Title and Registration" and "I Will Possess Your Heart".

On August 13, 2014, after 17 years with Death Cab for Cutie, Chris Walla decided to part ways with the band, stating that he plans to "continue making music, producing records, and erring on the side of benevolence and beauty whenever possible." Walla's last performance with the band occurred on September 13, 2014 at the Rifflandia Music Festival in Victoria, British Columbia.

In a 2015 interview, Walla explained that he left the band because he found himself disinterested in the music they were working on for the band's eighth studio album, Kintsugi.  He critiqued the songs as “flat,” none of his ideas seemed to be sticking, and he felt the band needed an infusion of fresh blood; "I was really dissatisfied with where the Death Cab stuff had gotten to when I quit as producer, and that’s why I quit."

Solo projects
Walla has recorded a variety of solo material and released his debut solo album, Field Manual, in 2008 on Barsuk Records. The song "Sing Again" became available for free download from Barsuk's website. Before the release of Field Manual, it was reported that two tracks recorded for Death Cab for Cutie's 2005 album, Plans, would be featured, but this is unconfirmed. Some of Walla's solo work has been released using the name Martin Youth Auxiliary, such as a  cassette was released in 1999 on Elsinor Records.

A solo instrumental album, titled Tape Loops, was released on October 16, 2015.

Production
In addition to being a musician Walla has a long career as a producer, earning production, engineering, and mixing credits on over thirty albums and EPs. His first credit was as the producer for Death Cab for Cutie's debut album, Something About Airplanes, released in 1998. Walla has produced all releases by Death Cab for Cutie to date, with the exceptions of Thank You For Today, Kintsugi and 1997's You Can Play These Songs with Chords EP, which was produced by Ben Gibbard. However, Walla earned production credits on the 2002 re-release of You Can Play These Songs with Chords, which featured 10 new songs. It was announced via Kelly Porter's Facebook Page Walla would be doing guitar work for her upcoming recording work.

Studios
Walla founded his own recording studio, located within his home in Portland, Oregon, named the Alberta Court. Prior to moving to Portland, from 2000 to 2005, he was the owner/proprietor of Seattle recording studio, the Hall of Justice, where Death Cab for Cutie and many Pacific Northwest bands recorded over the years. In 2012, Walla began rebuilding the Hall of Justice after moving back to Seattle.

Personal life
Walla married scholar, knitwear designer, and illustrator Dianna Potter in February 2013, at the Swedish Cultural Center in Seattle. Since leaving the band, Walla and his wife moved to Montreal, Quebec before later settling in Trondheim, Norway.

Discography
Selected credits
 Pinegrove, 11:11 (2022) – Mixer
 Braids, Shadow Offering (2020) – Producer
 Foxing, Nearer My God (2018) – Producer
 Lo Moon, Lo Moon (2018) – Producer
 Gotch, Good New Times (2016) – Co-producer
 Death Cab for Cutie, Kintsugi (2015) – Writer
 Rocky Votolato, Hospital Handshakes (2015) – Producer, engineer, mixer
 Fences, Lesser Oceans (2015) – Producer, engineer, writer, programming
 William Fitzsimmons, Lions (2014) – Producer, engineer, mixer, writer 
 The Lonely Forest, Adding Up the Wasted Hours (2013) – Engineer, mixer
 Death Cab for Cutie, Codes and Keys (2011) – Producer, engineer, mixer, writer
 Telekinesis, 12 Desperate Straight Lines (2011) – Engineer, mixer, writer
 The Lonely Forest, Arrows (2011) – Producer, engineer, mixer
 Ra Ra Riot, The Orchard (2010) – Mixer
 Someone Still Loves You Boris Yeltsin, Let It Sway (2010) – Co-producer, engineer
 The Thermals, Personal Life (2010) – Producer, engineer, mixer
 Gordon Downie, The Grand Bounce (2010) – Producer, engineer, mixer
 Death Cab for Cutie, The Twilight Saga: New Moon (soundtrack) (2009) – Producer, engineer, mixer, writer
 Death Cab for Cutie, The Open Door EP (2009) – Producer, engineer, mixer, writer
 Tegan and Sara, Sainthood (2009) – Co-producer, engineer
 Telekinesis, Telekinesis! (2009) – Producer, engineer, mixer
 So Many Dynamos, The Loud Wars (2009) – Producer, engineer, mixer
 Death Cab for Cutie, Narrow Stairs (2008) – Producer, engineer, mixer, writer
 Mates of State, Re-Arrange Us (2008) – Producer, engineer, loops
 Youth Group, The Night Is Ours (2008) – Guitar, vocals (background), mixer
 Nada Surf, Lucky (2008) – Engineer
 Chris Walla, Field Manual (2008) – Producer, engineer, mixer, writer
 Tegan and Sara, The Con (2007) – Producer, engineer, mixer
 The Decemberists, The Crane Wife (2006) – Producer, engineer, mixer
 Death Cab for Cutie, Plans (2005) – Producer, engineer, Mixer, writer
 Youth Group, Casino Twilight Dogs (2005) – Mixer
 Youth Group, Forever Young (2005) – Mixer
 Nada Surf, The Weight Is a Gift (2005) – Producer, engineer
 The Decemberists, Picaresque (2005) – Producer, engineer, mixer
 The Decemberists, The Tain (2005) – Producer, engineer, mixer
 The Thermals, Fuckin A (2004) – Producer, engineer, mixer
 Death Cab for Cutie, Transatlanticism (2003) – Producer, engineer, mixer, writer
 The Long Winters, When I Pretend to Fall (2003) – Producer, engineer, mixer
 The Postal Service, Give Up (2003) – Engineer, piano, drums, vocals
 The Stratford 4, Love & Distortion (2003) – Producer, engineer, mixer
 The Thermals, More Parts per Million (2003) – Mixer
 Rocky Votolato, Suicide Medicine (2003) – Producer, engineer, mixer
 Rocky Votolato, Light and Sound EP (2003) – Producer, engineer, mixer
 Death Cab for Cutie, The Stability EP (2002) – Producer, engineer, mixer, writer
 Death Cab for Cutie, You Can Play These Songs with Chords (2002) – Producer, engineer, mixer, writer
 David Cross, Shut Up You Fucking Baby! (2002) – Engineer
 Carissa's Wierd, Songs About Leaving (2002) – Engineer, mixer
 Hot Hot Heat, Knock Knock Knock (EP) (2002) – Producer, engineer
 Hot Hot Heat, Make Up The Breakdown (2002) – Additional recording, mixer
 The Long Winters, The Worst You Can Do Is Harm (2002) – Producer, engineer, mixer
 Nada Surf, Let Go (2002) – Engineer, mixer
 The Velvet Teen, Out of the Fierce Parade (2002) – Producer, engineer
 Death Cab for Cutie, The Photo Album (2001) – Producer, engineer, mixer, writer
 Death Cab for Cutie, The Forbidden Love EP (2000) – Producer, engineer, mixer, writer
 Death Cab for Cutie, We Have the Facts and We're Voting Yes (2000) – Producer, engineer, mixer, writer
 Death Cab for Cutie, Something About Airplanes (1998) – Producer, engineer, mixer, writer
 Mike Edel, Thresholds (2019) - Producer

References

External links

 20 Questions to Christopher Walla from 2000.
 Hall of Justice Recording
 Chris Walla interview, Jan. 2008

1975 births
Living people
Alternative rock guitarists
Alternative rock singers
American alternative rock musicians
American indie rock musicians
American male singers
American rock guitarists
American male guitarists
American rock singers
Death Cab for Cutie members
Singers from Oregon
Singers from Washington (state)
Record producers from Washington (state)
People from Bothell, Washington
Musicians from Seattle
The Long Winters members
American film score composers
Guitarists from Washington (state)
Guitarists from Oregon
21st-century American singers
American male film score composers
Barsuk Records artists
Atlantic Records artists